Camarosporium pistaciae is a fungal plant pathogen that causes blight in pistachio shoots and panicles.

References

External links 
 Index Fungorum
 USDA ARS Fungal Database

Fungal tree pathogens and diseases
Fruit tree diseases
Pleosporales